Mesosphaerocera is a genus of flies belonging to the family Lesser Dung flies. Along with Parasphaerocera and Neosphaerocera, Mesosphaerocera is closely related to Afromyia and Sphaerocera and forms a distinct supergeneric group.

Species
M. amicimyrmex Kim, 1972
M. annulicornis (Malloch, 1913)
M. facialis (Papp, 1978)
M. pueblensis Kim, 1972
M. robusta (Kim, 1972)

References

Sphaeroceroidea genera
Diptera of North America
Diptera of South America
Sphaeroceridae